Coupelle-Neuve is a commune in the Pas-de-Calais department in the Hauts-de-France region of France.

Geography
A village situated some 16 miles (26 km) east of Montreuil-sur-Mer on the D104 road.

Population

See also
Communes of the Pas-de-Calais department

References

Coupelleneuve
Artois